Maung Maung Win (born 8 December 1994) is a footballer from Myanmar who plays as a midfielder for Yangon United and the Myanmar national team.

International

References

External links

1994 births
Living people
Burmese footballers
Myanmar international footballers
People from Rakhine State
Association football midfielders